Schielo is a village and a former municipality in the district of Harz, Saxony-Anhalt, Germany. Since 1 August 2009, it is part of the town of Harzgerode. Basket weaving was common until in the early 20th century logging took over. Today agriculture, a number of small businesses, a caring home specialising in residential and nursing dementia care, as well as tourism related activities dominate the area.

Location 
Schielo lies to the east of Harzgerode, to the north of Königerode and the B242 Cross-Harz-Highway and to the west of Molmerswende.

Hiking 
While Schielo is outside the area of the Harzer Wandernadel hiking system, it is only three kilometers from the E11 european long distance path which runs from Ballenstedt to Wippra through the neighboring villages of Molmerswende and Steinbrücken. From Schielo, local trails lead to Anhalt Castle and Falkenstein Castle.

Notable people
Karl Blossfeldt (June 13, 1865 – December 9, 1932), photographer, born in Schielo.

References

Former municipalities in Saxony-Anhalt
Harzgerode
Duchy of Anhalt